Scory is a surname. Notable people with the surname include:

John Scory (died 1585), English Dominican friar
Sylvanus Scory ( 1551–1617), English courtier and politician